The Goatley boat was a collapsible boat built for military use. Assembly time was estimated at two minutes with two men. The boat was designed by, and named after, Fred Goatley of Saunders-Roe, and used in a number of commando and other operations by the British Forces during World War II.

Approximately 1000 Goatley boats were ordered by the War Office during World War II.

See also
 Operation Aquatint
 Assault boat
 Landing Craft Rubber Small
 Landing Craft Rubber Large
 Rigid Raider
 Mk 6 Assault Boat
 Combat Rubber Raiding Craft

References

World War II vehicles
Military boats